Pen-Ek Karaket (born 18 March 1990, Bangkok) is a Thai taekwondo practitioner who competed at the 2012 Summer Olympics in the under 58 kg weight class.  Karaket lost to Lee Dae-Hoon in the first round.  As Lee reached the gold medal match, Karaket was entered into the repechage.  Karaket beat Tamer Bayoumi to reach the bronze medal match but lost that to Óscar Muñoz of Colombia.

Karaket is coached by Thailand's national taekwondo coach Choi Young-Seok.  He also competed in the Asian Games 2010 where he earned silver for Thailand.

Karaket graduated from Budin Decha School in the year 2007. Currently he is enrolled to Kasetsart University.

References

External links
 Profile
 

1990 births
Living people
Asian Games medalists in taekwondo
Pen-ek Karaket
Taekwondo practitioners at the 2012 Summer Olympics
Pen-ek Karaket
Taekwondo practitioners at the 2010 Asian Games
Taekwondo practitioners at the 2014 Asian Games
Pen-ek Karaket
Medalists at the 2010 Asian Games
Pen-ek Karaket
Southeast Asian Games medalists in taekwondo
Competitors at the 2009 Southeast Asian Games
Competitors at the 2011 Southeast Asian Games
Pen-ek Karaket
Asian Taekwondo Championships medalists
Pen-ek Karaket